Com or COM may refer to:

Computing
 COM (hardware interface), a serial port interface on IBM PC-compatible computers
 COM file, or .com file, short for "command", a file extension for an executable file in MS-DOS
 .com, an Internet top-level domain, originally short for "commercial"
 Component Object Model, a Microsoft software interface technology
 Computer-on-module, a type of single-board computer

Transport
 Comair (USA), an airline which was a wholly owned subsidiary of Delta Air Lines by ICAO airline designator
 Commonwealth MRT station, a Mass Rapid Transit station in Singapore by MRT station abbreviation

Other
 COM (manga magazine)
 Cốm, green rice dish in Vietnam
 Common rail (electricity), a common path of currents in an electronic circuit, often for the ground
 Center of mass
 Center-of-momentum frame
 Coma Berenices (constellation), standard astronomical abbreviation
 Comoros, ISO 3166-1 alpha-3 country code
 College of Marin, a community college in Marin County, California
 College of the Mainland, a community college in Texas City, Texas
 Collectivité d'outre-mer, a French overseas collectivity, or first-order administrative division
 Concerned Officers Movement, anti-war organization
 Commander of the Order of Merit of the Police Forces, Canadian decoration post-nominal letters
 Either of two figures named Com in the Book of Mormon: an early Jaredite king, son of Coriantum; and a late Jaredite king
 Como,  a city and comune in Lombardy, Italy, in Romansh language

See also
 Comm (disambiguation)
 Command (disambiguation)
 dot-com (disambiguation)